The 2017 Women's World Nine-ball Championship was a professional nine-ball pool tournament which was held in Hainan Chengmai (China) from 8 to 11 November 2017. The event was organized by the Guoao Group, which has hosted this event from 2013.

Overall 64 players from all around  the world was divided into 8 groups of 8 players, where double elimination format was applied. In the group stage all matches were race to 7 with alternate break format. Overall 32 players proceeded to the main tournament - knockout stage. In the knockout stage all matches were played race to 9. 

Siming Chen won the title with the 9–7 victory over Pan Xiaoting in the final. It was Chen's first Women's World Nine-ball title.

Prize money
The prize money for the event is shown below.

Preliminary round - Double elimination 
Source:

In the group stage, the double elimination format was played with race to 7.

Group A

Group B

Group C

Group D

Group E

Group F

Group G

Group H

Main tournament - Last 32 
Knockout stage consisted of last 32 players. Defending champion - Han Yu was defeated by Pan Xiaoting in semi-finals 5–9.

Final 
The final was played between two Chinese players - Chen Siming and Xiaoting Pan. Alternate break format was played. Chen Siming had three break-and-run in racks: 8, 10 and 12. Xiaoting Pan had two break-and-run in racks 1 and 3.

References 

WPA World Nine-ball Championship
Women's world championships
2017 in Chinese women's sport